Harbour Mille-Little Harbour East is a local service district and designated place in the Canadian province of Newfoundland and Labrador.

Geography 
Harbour Mille-Little Harbour East is in Newfoundland within Subdivision I of Division No. 2. It is located on the Burin Peninsula. The designated place consists in the communities of Harbour Mille and Little Harbour East.

Demographics 

Government 
Harbour Mille-Little Harbour East is a local service district (LSD) that is governed by a committee responsible for the provision of certain services to the community. The chair of the LSD committee is Robert Pardy.

See also 
List of communities in Newfoundland and Labrador
List of designated places in Newfoundland and Labrador
List of local service districts in Newfoundland and Labrador

References 

Populated coastal places in Canada
Designated places in Newfoundland and Labrador
Local service districts in Newfoundland and Labrador